Thiago Almeida may refer to:

 Thiago Almeida (rower) (born 1980), Brazilian rower
 Thiago Almeida (footballer) (born 1988), Brazilian footballer

See also
 Tiago Almeida (disambiguation)